Lake Donuzlav also referred to as Donuzlav Bay  is the deepest lake of Crimea and biggest in Chornomorske Raion. It is a protected landscape and recreational park of the Autonomous Republic of Crimea.

In practice it is no longer a lake but rather a bay since 1961, when a sandy spit ( wide) separating it from the Black Sea was dug out with a 200-metre width channel. The lake is as salty as the sea near its mouth but bottom springs make the water much more sweet near the head.

Overview
Donuzlav is well known for a top secret naval base that was established here in 1960s as the Soviet Crimean Naval Base. The base was particularly notable for housing air-cushioned landing craft. Following the dissolution of the Soviet Union, the base was passed to the Armed Forces of Ukraine and was one of the three main naval bases as the Southern Naval Base (Ukraine). After the Russian annexation of Crimea in 2014 the base was occupied by the Russian military that reinstated its previous name.

Donuzlav is located in Chornomorske and Saky raions (districts) at the Tarkhankut Peninsula as well as Yevpatoria Municipality. Donuzlav is one of several lakes located around the peninsula. Donuzlav is connected to the sea by a ship channel.

It has several small bays. Banks are high, steep, and winding. At separate parts of the lake, a wetland vegetation is common (i.e. common reed, cattail, others).

In the upper portion of the lakes are located two dams for fish farming, in the mid portion is a naval base. On the banks there is a wind-powered energy station with 53 wind turbines.

To the lake are headed several gulches (semi-dried streams) among which are Staryi Donuzlav, Donuzlav, Chernushka, and Burnuk.

Settlements
Novoozerne, Yevpatoria Municipality
Myrnyi, Yevpatoria Municipality
Ozerivka, Chornomorske Raion
Krasnoyarske, Chornomorske Raion

Crimean crisis
On 5 March 2014, during the Crimean crisis of 2014, Russian sailors scuttled two Russian Black Sea Fleet vessels, the anti-submarine ship  and the rescue tugboat Shakhter, at the entrance to Donuzlav Bay to prevent Ukrainian Navy ships from accessing the Black Sea.

See also
Cherkasy, a film

References

Further reading

Yegiazarov, V. At Donuzlav. Notes of underwater hunter (На Донузлаве. Заметки подводного охотника). "Berega Tavridy", 2001.

Lakes of Ukraine
Lakes of Crimea
Yevpatoria Municipality